Claude de Vin des Œillets, known as Mademoiselle des Œillets (Provence 1637 – Paris, 18 May 1687), was a mistress of King Louis XIV of France and the companion of the official royal mistress and favourite Madame de Montespan. She was known for her involvement in the famous Affair of the Poisons (1679–1680).

Daughter of the actors Nicolas de Vin and Louise Faviot. 

She became the trusted lady's companion of Montespan before 1669. During the Affair of the Poisons, she was said to have made more than fifty visits to the poisoners. she was pointed out as the replacement of Montespan in the black masses. She was protected from any persecution by the monarch and Colbert, but the affair implicated Montespan and ruined the latter's relationship with the king.

Œillets retired from court in 1678 to a comfortable life in her Paris residence and country estate until her death.

 She had a child by the king, Louise de Maisonblanche (17 June 1676 – 12 September 1718), later "Baroness of La Queue" by marriage. The king never recognised her as his daughter.

References 

1637 births
1687 deaths
1680 crimes
Mistresses of Louis XIV
French ladies-in-waiting
Affair of the Poisons